The 9th FINA World Junior Synchronised Swimming Championships was held August 15–18, 2002 in Montreal, Quebec, Canada. The synchronised swimmers are aged between 15 and 18 years old, from 31 nations, swimming in four events: Solo, Duet, Team and Free combination.

Participating nations
31 nations swam at the 2004 World Junior Championships were:

Results

References

2004 in synchronized swimming
FINA World Junior Synchronised Swimming Championships
Swimming
Jun
International aquatics competitions hosted by Canada
Synchronized swimming in Canada